Rudolf II von Scherenberg (c. 1401 – 1495) was Bishop of Würzburg from 1466 until his death.  His longevity (about 94) and long reign were significant.

Rudolf von Scherenberg was the son of Erhard von Scherenberg and Anna von Massbach. On 30 April 1466, he was appointed as bishop to replace Johann von Grumbach. He was confirmed as bishop on 20 June 1466. 

The Scherenberg Gate at the Fortress Marienberg, the entrance to the main courtyard, is named after him.

Tomb
Prince-Bishop von Scherenberg is best known because of his tomb in  Würzburg Cathedral.  On his death in 1495 , his successor, Lorenz von Bibra, commissioned Tilman Riemenschneider to make his monument.

References 
Chapuis, J., 1999: Tilman Riemenschneider: Master Sculptor of the Late Middle Ages. National Gallery London Publications  ; 
Wendehorst, A., 1978: Das Bistum Würzburg: Teil 3. Die Bischofsreihe von 1455 -1617 (pp. 20–51)

External links
 Link to biography in German
 
 Victoria & Albert web page on cast copy of tomb

1400s births
1495 deaths
Prince-Bishops of Würzburg
Burials at Würzburg Cathedral
Dukes of Franconia
Sculptures by Tilman Riemenschneider